Brilliant Cutoff Viaduct of the Pennsylvania Railroad located along Washington Boulevard in the Lincoln-Lemington-Belmar/Homewood neighborhoods of Pittsburgh, Pennsylvania. It carries the Brilliant Branch, a small connector railway, and was built in 1902.  It was added to the List of Pittsburgh History and Landmarks Foundation Historic Landmarks in 2003.

See also
List of bridges documented by the Historic American Engineering Record in Pennsylvania

References

External links

Brilliant Cutoff Viaduct over Silver Lake at Pghbridges.com

Bridges completed in 1902
Pennsylvania Railroad bridges
Historic American Engineering Record in Pennsylvania
Viaducts in the United States
Railroad bridges in Pennsylvania
Stone arch bridges in the United States